Arrowhead Mills is a brand of organic baking mixes, grains, cereals, and nut butters.  

The brand has been owned by Hain Celestial Group since 1999. Since 2019, the brand has been owned by Hometown Food Co.  Its consumer affairs department is located in Boulder, Colorado.

History
Arrowhead Mills was founded in 1960 by nutritionist Frank Ford in Hereford, the seat of Deaf Smith County in the southern Texas Panhandle west of Amarillo, Texas. Ford sought to sell corn and wheat free of pesticides. The grains were initially stone-ground and sold to local markets. Later, Ford built its current facility in Hereford and added other products such as beans, seeds, cereals, and baking mixes.

Products
Products include:

Breakfast Foods, including cold and hot cereals, granola, and pancake/waffle mixes;
Flours, including white, rye, spelt, oat, and millet flours among other grains;
Baking Ingredients, such as wheat germ and wheat gluten;
Baking mixes, such as bread mixes, pie crusts, and dessert mixes;
Nut Butters, including almond, cashew, and peanut butter, and tahini;
Beans, such as Anasazi beans, green lentils, and soybeans;
Grains, including ancient grains such as amaranth and quinoa;
Seeds, including flax seeds and popcorn;
Rice of several varieties; and
Cooking Mixes, such as stuffing mix.

Origin of ingredients
Many Arrowhead Mills products are certified at least 70% organic by the Texas Department of Agriculture (TDA) or Pro-Cert Organic Systems. Among the non-organic products are some hot and cold cereals, most nut butters, and some baking mixes.  

The company has released more specific information on the origins of the following ingredients: 

Spelt, Sesame, Tahini, Flaxseed, Oat, and all Cereals are grown and processed in the United States.
Almonds are from California.
Peanuts are from the United States.
Corn, Cornmeal, and Brown Rice are from Texas.
Rice is from California, Texas, or Louisiana.
Barley is from the North and Central United States.
Quinoa is specified only as 'not from China.'  (Quinoa is often grown in South America)
Amaranth is from Nebraska.
Lentils are from North Dakota or California.
Beans and Rye are from North Dakota.

Companies cannot release exact origins of ingredients for proprietary reasons. However, many of the growing conditions in the above locations can be researched in greater detail.

See also

List of food companies

References

External links
 
Almond Board of California
Peanut Production Guide from NM State University

Baking mixes
Companies based in Texas
Food and drink companies of the United States